Occasion: Connick on Piano, Volume 2 is an instrumental album recorded in 2005, presenting Harry Connick Jr. on piano and Branford Marsalis on saxophone, playing their own jazz compositions.

Presented as Volume 2 in the Connick on Piano series from Marsalis Music. (Volume 1 is Connick's quartet album Other Hours.)

Harry Connick Jr explains how it came to be a duo album: "When my drummer Arthur Latin hurt his shoulder, I decided to wait before recording another quartet album, and asked Branford if he would do something with me.  What started as a project intended to mix solo piano and duo performances turned into an entire duo album."

A DVD with Connick & Marsalis performing music live from this album, A Duo Occasion, was released in November 2005.

Track listing

All songs written by Harry Connick Jr. except where noted.

"Brown World" – 4:40
"Valentine's Day" – 5:14
"Occasion" (Branford Marsalis) – 3:01
"Spot" – 5:58
"I Like Love More" – 5:05
"All Things" – 5:58
"Win" – 6:04
"Virgoid" – 4:12
"Remember The Tarpon" – 7:10
"Lose" – 5:51
"Steve Lacy" (Marsalis) – 3:16
"Chanson Du Vieux Carre" – 2:17
"Good To Be Home" – 6:25

Notes
"Chanson Du Vieux Carré", track #12, means "Song of the French Quarter". Chanson Du Vieux Carré is also the name of the third album in the Connick on piano series.
Track #5 "I Like Love More", #6 "All Things" and #13 "Good To Be Home" are compositions from Connick's Tony nominated score for the 2001 Broadway musical Thou Shalt Not.

Personnel
Harry Connick Jr. – piano
Branford Marsalis – soprano, tenor sax
Branford Marsalis – Saxophone, Producer
Arnold Levine – Art Direction, Design
Jean-Pierre LeGuillou – Art Producer
Frank Hunter – Album Photography
Rob "Wacko" Hunter – Engineer, Mixing
Greg Calbi – Mastering
Rick Dior – Assistant Engineer
Tracey Freeman – Producer
Harry Connick Jr. – Piano, Liner Notes

1References

External links
Audio samples, at harryconnickjr.com
NPR radio: Harry Connick Jr., Branford Marsalis Team Up

2005 albums
Harry Connick Jr. albums
Instrumental albums
Marsalis Music albums